Aigle Royal de la Menoua is a Cameroonian football club based in Dschang. They are a member of Cameroonian Football Federation.

Honours
 Cameroon Première Division: 0
 Cameroon Cup: 0
Runners-up: 2008.

Super Coupe Roger Milla: 0

Performance in CAF competitions
CAF Champions League: 1 appearance
2006 – Preliminary Round

CAF Confederation Cup: 1 appearance
2009 – First Round of 16

Notes

Football clubs in Cameroon
1932 establishments in French Cameroon
Sports clubs in Cameroon
Association football clubs established in 1932
Dschang